Boura Hatabaksa: The Eternal Bond is an Indian Odia-language family drama film directed by Narayan Pati and written by Arati Pattajoshi released in 2022. It was produced by Sanjay Das and Rosalin Das under the Chairosana Film Productions Pvt. Ltd banner. It is a family drama. Mother’s unconditional love for her son, depth of husband and wife’s relationship and emotional bond between two generations.

Cast
 Narayan Pati as Raghunath
 Lopamudra mishra
 Sabita palei
 Rajesh Panda
 Abhisekh Sahoo
 Gourav

Soundtrack
The music of the film was composed by Khiti Prakash Mahapatra. The lyrics were written by Devdas Chhotray and Managobinda Barik. The soundtracks are released on 20 July 2022.

Release 
This movie released on 30 December 2022 on theaters. Before that, the release dates extended a few times.

References

External links
 

2022 films
2020s Odia-language films